Volleyball at the 2011 Island Games was held from 26 June–1 July 2011 at the Fairway Sports Complex and Rew Valley Sports Centre.

Events

Medal table

Summary

References
Volleyball at the 2011 Island Games

2011 Island Games
2011 in volleyball
2011